The 1947 Cal Poly San Dimas Broncos football team represented the Cal Poly Voorhis Unit—now known as California State Polytechnic University, Pomona—as an independent during the 1947 college football season. This was the first year of intercollegiate play for the school. Led by Bob Ashton in his first and only season as head coach, Cal Poly San Dimas compiled a record of 4–4–1. The team was outscored by its opponents 180 to 124 for the season.

Schedule

References

Cal Poly San Dimas
Cal Poly Pomona Broncos football seasons
Cal Poly Pomona Broncos football